This is a list of Lieutenant Governors of Ladakh, a Union territory of India that came into existence on 31 October 2019. The Lieutenant Governor is directly appointed by the President of India, The Lt.Governor acts as the representative of the Central Government who is not obliged to the Legislature ,which in case of Ladakh doesn't have a Legislature. The Central Government governs the territory via Lt. Governor.

Background

In August 2019, a Reorganisation Act was passed by both houses of the Indian Parliament. The provisions contained in the reorganised the state of Jammu and Kashmir into two union territories; Jammu and Kashmir and Ladakh on 31 October 2019. The act established the position of Lieutenant Governor of Ladakh.

Lieutenant Governors of Ladakh

See also
 List of current Indian lieutenant governors and administrators

References

Government of Ladakh
Lieutenant governors of Ladakh
Indian government officials
Ladakh
Ladakh-related lists